The Zanzibar Tavern in Toronto, Ontario, is an adult entertainment nightclub and local landmark found on Toronto's Yonge Street strip. It is one of Toronto's oldest nightclubs, which celebrated its 60th anniversary in 2020.

History

David Cooper
Cooper was born to Jewish parents Harry and Bessie, who ran a business in Kensington Market. When he turned 18 years old, he ran his own shop on the Danforth, where he met his future wife, Annette. At the end of the 1950s, Cooper and his uncle purchased the Zanzibar Tavern for a previous owner.

Zanzibar Tavern
Zanzibar Tavern was opened in 1959 by David Cooper, who said: "You used to be able to hit 12 strip bars between Bloor and Queen." The bar originally opened as a live music venue, one of several on Yonge Street, between Gerrard and King, in the 1950s and 1960s. It featured jazz and blues in the early 1960s, before becoming the multi-media "Zanzibar A-Go-Go" dance club featuring rock and roll and go-go dancers. During this time, the bar also became the first to advertise for topless girls after many regular go-go girls refused to go topless. They hired six of the girls who responded and repurposed the uniform to be topless, with red pasties and a red collar. This helped the bar's transition into a strip club during the 1970s, reflecting the transformation of the Yonge Street strip from a live music centre in the 1960s to a centre for the sex industry in the 1970s. 

In 1967, local newspapers christened the Yonge Street strip "Psychedelic Avenue" as Zanzibar competed with other bars in a "war of the watts". Upon recalling the time, Cooper said he was creating a "Twenty-first Century total environment with "stroboscopic" lights, mannequins and closed-circuit cameras that would take photos of the dance floor and project them on the wall. Throughout the decade, Zanzibar has featured such diverse acts as burlesque goddess Annie Ample in the 1980s, who called the strip club "her favourite place".

In 2006, David Cooper's son quit practising divorce law and took over the running of Zanzibar. The establishment suffered serious damage to its facade in June 2010, during the G20 summit when Black Bloc anarchists vandalized Yonge Street during the 2010 G-20 Toronto summit protests. They received nearly $6,000 in compensation. In the same year, the club garnered attention again when a librarian from nearby Ryerson University took clandestine photographs of dancers and wait staff on breaks on the bar's rooftop which were then published on Torontoist, a local news blog. Cooper responded to the photos saying the women felt that their privacy was violated. 

In 2017, Zanzibar received a notice of violation for advertising their services on a 78-inch LED television that faces Yonge Street at ground level. Cooper argued that Zanzibar has advertised in its front window for about 60 years and that the 2010 sign bylaw that prohibits storefront video advertising should not apply retroactively.

Popular culture
The Zanzibar has appeared in numerous Hollywood films such as The Incredible Hulk. It was also on a few episodes of Degrassi (season 6, episodes 18 and 19).

It has also featured in unusual lawsuits, including one involving a man who sued his wife, a former Zanzibar stripper, for knowingly infecting him with HIV.

See also
 List of strip clubs

References

Nightclubs in Toronto
Strip clubs in Canada